Alfonso Adolfo José Troisi Couto (born January 21, 1954), nicknamed Charles, is an Argentine former football striker.

Playing career
Troisi started his professional playing career in 1973 with Chacarita Juniors.

He quickly moved to Europe, first playing in France for Olympique de Marseille and Montpellier HSC, before joining Spain where he played for Hércules CF, AD Almería and Córdoba CF.

Honours

References

External links

weltfussball  

1954 births
Living people
Footballers from Buenos Aires
Argentine footballers
Association football forwards
Chacarita Juniors footballers
Olympique de Marseille players
Montpellier HSC players
Ligue 1 players
Ligue 2 players
Hércules CF players
AD Almería footballers
Córdoba CF players
La Liga players
Argentine expatriate footballers
Expatriate footballers in France
Expatriate footballers in Spain
Argentine expatriate sportspeople in France
Argentine expatriate sportspeople in Spain